The Pennsylvania Railroad's class H6, H6a, and H6b steam locomotives were of the 2-8-0 "Consolidation" freight type, the most numerous class on the railroad with 1,707 units and the second most prolific 2-8-0 class in North America, with the USATC S160 class rostering 88 units more. The three subclasses differed as follows:

These rebuilt units were reclassified to H6sa and H6sb.

Class H6 were used throughout the system as mainline freight haulers, on local freights, and as switchers in yards. They were frequently seen double- and tripleheading long freight trains up the steep grades on the Pennsy.

During the period when the PRR was building the H-6 class, the railroad had effective stock control of the Baltimore and Ohio Railroad, and installed a PRR vice-president Leonor F. Loree, as president of the B&O. Subsequently, the B&O bought a large group of identical locomotives from the American Locomotive Company; these were initially classified class I-4, later becoming class E-24. The E-24 class had many variations, some being converted to switchers, or receiving superheaters and new valve chests.  The E-24a was equivalent to the PRR H-6sb.  None of the B&O E-24 class survived to the diesel era.

China
Around 1938, thirty H6sb were sold second-hand to the South Manchuria Railway (Mantetsu), which designated them Sorisa (ソリサ) class (Sori, from "Consolidation", and sa, from san, "three", to indicate the third class of Consolidation-type locomotives operated by Mantetsu). To distinguish these from the British-made Sorisa 1−7, the H6sb were nicknamed ペンソリ Pensori (Pennsylvania Consolidation). Of these, fifteen were taken up by Mantetsu, which numbered them ソリサ8 through ソリサ22, whilst the other fifteen were assigned to the Manchukuo National Railway, where they were numbered ソリサ547 through ソリサ561.

After the end of the Pacific War, both Mantetsu and the Manchukuo National were absorbed by the China Railway, which designated them class KD10.

Survivors

PRR #2846, an H6sb built in 1905 by the Baldwin Locomotive Works, has been preserved by the Railroad Museum of Pennsylvania with two other examples of the H class. #2846 was added to the National Register of Historic Places in 1979 as Consolidation Freight Locomotive No. 2846.

References

ALCO locomotives
Baldwin locomotives
Lima locomotives
2-8-0 locomotives
Steam locomotives of the United States
Standard gauge locomotives of the United States
Steam locomotives of China
Rolling stock of Manchukuo
H8
Baltimore and Ohio locomotives
Railway locomotives introduced in 1905
Railway locomotives on the National Register of Historic Places in Pennsylvania
Freight locomotives
Transportation in Lancaster County, Pennsylvania
National Register of Historic Places in Lancaster County, Pennsylvania